This is an alphabetical list of the fungal taxa as recorded from South Africa. Currently accepted names have been appended.

Ba
Genus: Bacidia De Not. 1846 (Lichens)
Bacidia aemula (Stizenb.) Zahlbr. 1926
Bacidia amylothelia Vain. 1926
Bacidia bacillifera (Nyl.) Branth & Rostr. 1869
Bacidia beckhausii Körb. 1860
Bacidia beckhausii var. stenospora (Hepp) Arnold 1871 f. acutata Zahlbr.
Bacidia capreolina (Stizenb.) Zahlbr. 1926
Bacidia caruncula (Stizenb.) Zahlbr. 1926
Bacidia chlorophaeata (Nyl.) Zahlbr. 1926
Bacidia cyrtocheila (Stizenb.) Zahlbr. 1926
Bacidia effusa var. intermedia (Hepp ex Stizenb.) Zahlbr. 1926
Bacidia endoleuca (Nyl.) J. Kickx f. 1867
Bacidia endoleucella (Stizenb.) Zahlbr. 1926
Bacidia epicyanea Vain. 1926
Bacidia friesiana var. norrlinii (Lamy) Vain. 1922
Bacidia fuscorubella (Hoffm.) Bausch 1869 accepted as Bacidia polychroa (Th. Fr.) Körb., (1860) 
Bacidia heteroloma Zahlbr. f. firmior Vain*
Bacidia inconsequens (Nyl.) Zahlbr. 1926
Bacidia inconveniens (Nyl.) Zahlbr. 1926
Bacidia intermedia Hampe ex A. Massal. 1861
Bacidia laurocerasi var. amylothelia (Vain.) Zahlbr. 1926
Bacidia leucostephana (Stizenb.) Zahlbr. 1926
Bacidia lugubris (Sommerf.) Zahlbr. 1905 accepted as Schaereria lugubris (A. Massal.) Körb., (1855)
Bacidia luteola (Schrad.) Mudd 1861 accepted as Bacidia rubella (Hoffm.) A. Massal., (1852)
Bacidia luteola f. chlorotica (Ach.) Zahlbr. 1926 accepted as Pseudosagedia chlorotica (Ach.) Hafellner & Kalb, (1995)
Bacidia luteola f. conspondens (Nyl.) Zahlbr. 1926
Bacidia medialis (Tuck.) Zahlbr. 1927
Bacidia millegrana (Taylor) Zahlbr. 1888
Bacidia polychroa (Th. Fr.) Körb., (1860) reported as Bacidia fuscorubella (Hoffm.) Bausch 1869 
Bacidia proposita (Nyl.) Zahlbr. 1926
Bacidia rubella (Hoffm.) A. Massal., (1852) reported as Bacidia luteola (Schrad.) Mudd 1861
Bacidia rufata (Stizenb.) Zahlbr. 1926
Bacidia sabuletorum (Schreb.) Lettau 1912 accepted as Bilimbia sabuletorum (Schreb.) Arnold, (1869)
Bacidia stupposa (A. Massal.) Zahlbr. 1905
Bacidia subluteola (Nyl.) Zahlbr. 1902
Bacidia subspadicea (Müll. Arg.) Zahlbr. 1926
Bacidia trifaria (Stizenb.) Zahlbr. 1926

Genus: Bactridium Kunze 1817 
Bactridium flavum Kunze 1817

Genus: Baeomyces Pers. 1794 (Lichens)
Baeomyces capensis  Taylor 1847
Baeomyces monocarpus (Ach.) Ach. 1803
Baeomyces roseus Pers. 1794 accepted as Dibaeis rosea (Pers.) Clem., (1909)

Genus: Bagnisiopsis Theiss. & Syd. 1915, accepted as Coccodiella Hara, (1910)
Bagnisiopsis disciformis (Wint).*

Genus: Balansia  Speg. 1885
Balansia cynodontis Syd. 1935
Balansia trachypogonis Doidge 1948
Balansia sp.

Genus: Balladyna Racib. 1900 
Balladyna leonensis Syd. 1939
Balladyna tenuis Hansf. 1941
Balladyna ugandensis Syd. 1939
Balladyna velutina (Berk. & M.A. Curtis) Höhn. 1910

Genus: Balladynastrum Hansf. 1941, accepted as Balladynopsis Theiss. & Syd., (1918)
Balladynastrum glabrum Hansf. 1946 accepted as Balladynocallia glabra (Hansf.) Bat., (1965)

Genus: Balladynella Theiss. & Syd. 1918, accepted as Dysrhynchis Clem., (1909)
Balladynella confusa  (Doidge) Hansf. 1946 accepted as Rizalia confusa Doidge, (1924)

Genus: Balladynocallia Bat. 1965
Balladynocallia glabra (Hansf.) Bat., (1965) reported as Balladynastrum glabrum Hansf. 1946

Genus: Basisporium Molliard 1902, accepted as Nigrospora Zimm., (1902)
Basisporium gallarum Molliard 1902 accepted as Nigrospora oryzae (Berk. & Broome) Petch, (1924)

Genus: Battarrea Pers. 1801
Battarrea diguetii Pat. & Har. 1896 [as diqueti] accepted as Battarreoides diguetii (Pat. & Har.) R. Heim & T. Herrera, (1962)
Battarrea phalloides Pers.
Battarrea stevenii Fr.

Genus; Battarreoides T. Herrera 1953
Battarreoides diguetii (Pat. & Har.) R. Heim & T. Herrera, (1962) reported as Battarrea diguetii Pat. & Har. 1896 [as diqueti]

Genus: Baumiella Henn. 1903, accepted as Leptosphaeria Ces. & De Not. (1863)
Baumiella caespitosa Henn. 1903

Be
Genus: Beauveria Vuill. 1912
Beauveria bassiana  (Bals.-Criv.) Vuill. 1912
Beauveria globulifera (Speg.) F. Picard 1914 accepted as Beauveria bassiana (Bals.-Criv.) Vuill., (1912)

Genus: Belonidium Mont. & Durieu 1848, accepted as Lachnum Retz., (1769)

Synonymy:
Belonidium capense (Kalchbr. & Cooke) Sacc. 1889,

Genus: Beniowskia Racib. 1900
Beniowskia penniseti Wakef., (1916), accepted as Beniowskia sphaeroidea (Kalchbr. & Cooke) E.W. Mason, (1928)) 
Beniowskia sphaeroidea (Kalchbr. & Cooke) E.W. Mason, (1928)),

Bi
Genus: Biatora (Lichens)
Biatora decipiens  (Hedw.) Fr. 1831, accepted as Psora decipiens (Hedw.) Hoffm., (1794)
Biatora melampepla (Tuck.) Tuck. 1888
Biatora triptophylla corallinoides Floerke (sic) possibly Biatora thriptophylla var. corallinoides (Hoffm.) Fr., (1845) or Biatora thriptophylla var. coralloides Rabenh. [as Biatora triptophylla var. coralloides], (1845)
Biatora zeyheri A. Massal. 1861

Genus: Biatorella  De Not. 1846,
Biatorella armstrongiae Zahlbr. (sic), possibly (T.A. Jones) Stizenb. 1927
Biatorella austroafricana Zahlbr. 1926
Biatorella clavulus (Stizenb.) Zahlbr. 1927
Biatorella lugens (Stizenb.) Zahlbr. 1927
Biatorella palmeti (Stizenb.) Zahlbr. 1927
Biatorella robiginans (Stizenb.) Zahlbr. 1927

Genus: Bispora Corda 1837
Bispora effusa Peck 1891

Bl
Genus: Blastenia A. Massal. 1852
Blastenia acaciae (Vain.) Zahlbr. 1932
Blastenia aspicilioidea Zahlbr. 1936, accepted as Huea aspicilioidea (Zahlbr.) C.W. Dodge, (1971)
Blastenia brunnthaleri Zahlbr. 1932
Blastenia capensis Trevis.*
Blastenia confluens Müll. Arg. 1888 accepted as Huea confluens (Müll. Arg.) C.W. Dodge, (1971)
Blastenia ferruginea (Huds.) A. Massal. 1852
Blastenia imponens (Stizenb.) Zahlbr. 1930
Blastenia laingsbergensis Zahlbr.*
Blastenia leptospora Zahlbr. 1926, accepted as Huea leptospora (Zahlbr.) C.W. Dodge, (1971)
Blastenia ochracea var. parvula (Stizenb.) Zahlbr. 1930
Blastenia poliotera (Nyl.) Müll. Arg. 1880
Blastenia praemicans (Nyl.) Zahlbr. 1930
Blastenia psorothecioides (Vain.) Zahlbr. 1932
Blastenia punicae (Vain.) Zahlbr. 1932, accepted as Huea punicae (Vain.) C.W. Dodge, (1971)
Blastenia punicea Müll.Arg.*
Blastenia sedutrix (Stizenb.) Zahlbr. 1930. [as seductric] accepted as Huea sedutrix (Stizenb.) C.W. Dodge, (1971)
Blastenia subsalicina Zahlbr. 1932
Blastenia testaceorufa (Vain.) Zahlbr. 1930
Blastenia vasquesia A. Massal. 1861

Family: Blastocladiaceae H.E. Petersen 1909

Bo 
Genus: Bolbitius  Fr. 1838
Bolbitius boltonii (Pers.) Fr. 1838 accepted as Bolbitius titubans (Bull.) Fr., (1838)
Bolbitius bulbillosus (Fr.) Gillet 1876
Bolbitius fragilis (L.) Fr. 1838, accepted as Bolbitius titubans (Bull.) Fr., (1838)
Bolbitius liberatus Kalchbr. 1879, accepted as Agrocybe liberata (Kalchbr.) E.F. Malysheva,(2019)
Bolbitius macowani Kalchbr.*
Bolbitius mitriformis Berk., (1844) [as mitraeformis] accepted as Galeropsis mitriformis (Berk.) R. Heim [as 'mitraeformis'], (1950)

Family: Boletoideae

Genus: Boletus  L. 1753
Boletus bovinus L. 1753  accepted as Suillus bovinus (L.) Roussel (1806)) 
Boletus collinitus  Fr. 1838 accepted as Suillus collinitus (Fr.) Kuntze, (1898)
Boletus cutipes Mass.*
Boletus edulis Bull. 1782
Boletus elegans Fr. (sic) possibly B. elegans Bull. 1782, accepted as Cerioporus varius (Pers.) Zmitr. & Kovalenko, (2016), B. elegans Bolton 1788, accepted as Grifola frondosa (Dicks.) Gray, (1821), or B. elegans Schumach. 1803, accepted as Suillus grevillei (Klotzsch) Singer,(1945)
Boletus eximius Peck (1887) accepted as Sutorius eximius (Peck) Halling, Nuhn, & Osmundson (2012)
Boletus flavidus Fr. 1815, accepted as Suillus flavidus (Fr.) J. Presl, (1846)
Boletus granulatus L. 1753, accepted as Suillus granulatus (L.) Roussel, (1796)
Boletus grevillei Klotzsch 1832 accepted as Suillus grevillei (Klotzsch) Singer,(1945)
Boletus luteus Linn. (1753), accepted as Suillus luteus (L.) Roussel (1796)
Boletus sanguineus Linn. (1763), accepted as Pycnoporus sanguineus (L.) Murrill (1904)
Boletus stellenbossiensis Van der Byl 1925
Boletus subflammeus Berk. 1876 accepted as Chalciporus subflammeus (Berk.) Klofac & Krisai, (2006)
Boletus versicolor L. 1753 accepted as Trametes versicolor (L.) Lloyd, (1921)
Boletus sp.

Genus: Bombyliospora De Not. 1852
Bombyliospora aureola (Tuck.) Zahlbr. 1930, accepted as Letrouitia aureola (Tuck.) Hafellner & Bellem., (1982)
Bombyliospora domingensis (Pers.) Zahlbr. 1888 accepted as Letrouitia domingensis (Pers.) Hafellner & Bellem., (1982)
Bombyliospora domingensis var. colorata Vain. 1921
Bombyliospora domingensis var. flavidula*
Bombyliospora domingensis var. flavocrocea (Nyl.) Zahlbr. 1930 accepted as Letrouitia flavocrocea (Nyl.) Hafellner & Bellem., (1982)
Bombyliospora domingensis var. glaucotropa (Nyl.) Vain. 1921
Bombyliospora domingensis var. inexplicata (Nyl.) Malme 1923
Bombyliospora domingensis var. inspersa Steiner (sic) possibly (Nyl.) Malme 1923
Bombyliospora flavidula (Tuck.) Zahlbr. 1930 accepted as Letrouitia flavidula (Tuck.) Hafellner, (1983)
Bombyliospora flavocrocea A. Massal. 1860 accepted as Letrouitia flavocrocea (Nyl.) Hafellner & Bellem., (1982) 
Bombyliospora incana A.L. Sm. 1911 accepted as Megalospora tuberculosa (Fée) Sipman, (1983)
Bombyliospora leprolyta (Nyl.) Zahlbr. 1930, accepted as Letrouitia leprolyta (Nyl.) Hafellner, (1983)
Bombyliospora tuberculosa (Fée) A. Massal. 1852 accepted as Megalospora tuberculosa (Fée) Sipman, (1983)
Bombyliospora tuberculosa f. geotropa (Stizenb.) Zahlbr. 1930
Bombyliospora zuluensis Vain. 1926

Genus: Borrera Ach. 1809
Borrera capensis (L. f.) Ach. 1810
Borrera chrysophthalma (L.) Ach. 1810 accepted as Teloschistes chrysophthalmus (L.) Th. Fr., (1861) 
Borrera flavicans (Sw.) Ach. 1810 accepted as Teloschistes flavicans (Sw.) Norman, (1852)
Borrera leucomelos (L.) Ach. [as 'leucomela'], (1810) accepted as Leucodermia leucomelos (L.) Kalb, 2015
Borrera pubera Ach. 1810
Borrera pubera var. capensis (L. f.) Ach. 1814

Genus: Botryodiplodia Sacc. 1884
Botryodiplodia oncidii (Henn.) Petr. & Syd., (1926) accepted as Sphaeropsis oncidii (Henn.) Died., (1914)
Botryodiplodia palmarum (Cooke) Petr. & Syd. 1927
Botryodiplodia theobromae Pat. 1892accepted as Lasiodiplodia theobromae (Pat.) Griffon & Maubl. (1909)

Genus: Botryosphaeria Ces. & De Not. 1863
Botryosphaeria mali V.A. Putterill 1919, accepted as Neofusicoccum ribis (Slippers, Crous & M.J. Wingf.) Crous, Slippers & A.J.L. Phillips, (2006)
Botryosphaeria ribis Shear, Stev. & Wilcox (sic) possibly Grossenb. & Duggar 1911, accepted as Neofusicoccum ribis (Slippers, Crous & M.J. Wingf.) Crous, Slippers & A.J.L. Phillips, (2006)
Botryosphaeria ribis var chromogena Shear, N.E. Stevens & Wilcox 1924 accepted as Neofusicoccum ribis (Slippers, Crous & M.J. Wingf.) Crous, Slippers & A.J.L. Phillips, (2006)
Botryosphaeria vitis (Schulzer) Sacc. 1882 accepted as Echusias vitis (Schulzer) Hazsl., (1873)

Genus: Botrytis 
Botrytis allii Munn 1917
Botrytis cinerea Pers. 1801
Botrytis fabae Sardiña 1929
Botrytis sp.

Genus: Bottaria A. Massal. 1856
Bottaria pyrenuloides (Mont.) Trevis. 1861accepted as Pyrenula pyrenuloides (Mont.) R.C. Harris,(1989)
Bottaria thelomorpha (Tuck.) Vain., [as thelemorpha],(1901)
Bottaria thwaitesii (Leight.) Vain. ex Van der Byl 1931 accepted as Anthracothecium thwaitesii (Leight.) Müll. Arg., (1880)

Genus: Bovista Pers. 1794
Bovista castanea Lév. 1846 accepted as Disciseda castanea (Lév.) Bottomley, (1948)
Bovista cervina Berk. 1842 accepted as Disciseda cervina (Berk.) Hollós, (1902)
Bovista citrina (Berk. & Broome) Bottomley 1948,
Bovista juglandiformis Berk. ex Massee 1888 accepted as Disciseda juglandiformis (Berk. ex Massee) Hollós, (1902)
Bovista lilacina Mont. & Berk. 1845 accepted as Calvatia lilacina (Mont. & Berk.) Henn., (1904)
Bovista oblongispora (Lloyd) Bottomley 1948
Bovista pusilla de Toni (sic) possibly (Batsch) Pers. 1801
Bovista umbrina Bottomley 1948
Bovista zeyheri Berk. ex Massee 1888

Genus: Bovistella Morgan 1892, accepted as Lycoperdon Pers., (1794)
Bovistella aspera (Lév.) Lloyd 1905 accepted as Lycoperdon asperum (Lév.) Speg., (1881)
Bovistella oblongispora Lloyd 1917 accepted as Bovista oblongispora (Lloyd) Bottomley, (1948)

Genus: Bovistoides Lloyd 1919, accepted as Myriostoma Desv., (1809)
Bovistoides simplex Lloyd 1919

Br
Genus: Brachysporium Sacc. 1886
Brachysporium faureae Henn. 1903 accepted as Annellophorella faureae (Henn.) M.B. Ellis, (1963)
Brachysporium pulviniforme Syd. & P. Syd. 1914 accepted as Stigmina pulviniformis (Syd. & P. Syd.) S. Hughes, (1952)

Genus: Brigantiaea Trevis. 1853 (Lichens)
Brigantiaea mariae Trevis. 1853

Genus: Broomeia Berk. 1844
Broomeia congregata Berk. 1844
Broomeia ellipsospora Höhn. 1905

Bu
Family: Buelliaceae Zahlbr. 1908 

Genus: Buellia De Not. 1846 (Lichens and lichenocolous)
Buellia abstracta (Nyl.) H. Olivier 1903 accepted as Buellia sequax (Nyl.) Zahlbr., (1931)
Buellia aethalea (Ach.) Th. Fr. 1874,
Buellia aethaloessa (Stizenb.) Zahlbr. 1931
Buellia afra (Stizenb.) Vain. 1901
Buellia africana Müll. Arg. 1879
Buellia africana (Tuck.) Tuck. 1866
Buellia albinea Müll. Arg. 1882
Buellia albula (Nyl.) Müll. Arg. 1894
Buellia ambuta (Stizenb.) Zahlbr., (1931) [as ambusta]
Buellia anatolodia A. Massal. 1861
Buellia angulosa J. Steiner 1926
Buellia antarctica A. Massal. 1861
Buellia antarctica var. effusa A. Massal. 1861
Buellia antarctica var. insularis A. Massal. 1861
Buellia brugierae Vain. 1926 accepted as Amandinea brugierae (Vain.) Marbach, (2000)
Buellia brunnthaleri Zahlbr. 1931
Buellia callaina (Stizenb.) Zahlbr. 1931
Buellia callispora var. tetrapla (Nyl.) J. Steiner 1907 accepted as Buellia tetrapla (Nyl.) Müll. Arg., (1888)
Buellia callisporoides Vain. ex Lynge 1937
Buellia cangoensis Vain. 1926
Buellia catalipa A. Massal. 1861
Buellia coeruleata Zahlbr. 1931
Buellia contingens (Nyl.) Zahlbr. 1931
Buellia dialytella Vain. 1926
Buellia diorista (Nyl.) Zahlbr. 1931, accepted as Amandinea diorista (Nyl.) Marbach, (2000)
Buellia disciformis (Fr.) Mudd 1861
Buellia disciformis f. vulgata H. Olivier 1884
Buellia disciformis var. cinereopruinosa Vain. ex Van der Byl 1931
Buellia disciformis var. lecanactina J. Steiner 1907
Buellia disciformis var. sanguinea (Müll. Arg.) Zahlbr. 1931
Buellia discolorans Zahlbr. 1931
Buellia dispersa A. Massal. 1856
Buellia distrahens Vain. 1926
Buellia distrata (Nyl.) Zahlbr. 1931
Buellia durbana Vain. 1926
Buellia endorhodina Vain. ex Lynge 1937
Buellia epichlora (Vain.) Zahlbr. 1932
Buellia glencairnensis Zahlbr. 1936
Buellia halonia (Ach.) Tuck. 1866
Buellia incrustans J. Steiner 1926, accepted as Amandinea incrustans (J. Steiner) Marbach, (2000)
Buellia incuriosa (Nyl.) Zahlbr. 1931
Buellia indissimilis (Nyl.) B. de Lesd. 1914
Buellia inquilina Tuck. 1866, accepted as Sclerococcum inquilinum (Tuck.) Ertz & Diederich, (2018)
Buellia insidians (Nyl.) Zahlbr. 1931
Buellia italica A. Massal. 1856
Buellia italica var. debanensis Bagl. 1875
Buellia italica var. recobarina A. Massal. 1856
Buellia langbaanensis Vain. 1926
Buellia lauri-cassiae (Fée) Müll. Arg. 1887,
Buellia lauri-cassiae var. macrosperma Zahlbr. 1932
Buellia leucina Müll. Arg. 1888
Buellia lutata (Stizenb.) Zahlbr. 1931
Buellia meizocarpa Vain. 1926
Buellia melanthina (Stizenb.) Zahlbr. 1931
Buellia micromera Vain. 1926 accepted as Baculifera micromera (Vain.) Marbach, (2000)
Buellia microsperma Müll. Arg. 1886
Buellia minutula (Körb.) Arnold 1870
Buellia myriocarpa (DC.) De Not. 1846 accepted as Amandinea punctata (Hoffm.) Coppins & Scheid., (1993)
Buellia myriocarpella (Nyl.) H. Olivier 1903
Buellia natalensis Vain. 1926, accepted as Amandinea natalensis (Vain.) Marbach, (2000)
Buellia nesiotis (Stizenb.) Zahlbr. 1931
Buellia ocoteae Vain. 1926
Buellia ocellata (Flörke ex Flot.) Körb., (1855) recorded as Buellia verruculosa (Sm.) Mudd 1861,  
Buellia oleicola (Nyl.) Zahlbr. 1931 accepted as Amandinea oleicola (Nyl.) Giralt & van den Boom, (2012)
Buellia olivacea Müll. Arg. 1893
Buellia pachnodes (Stizenb.) Zahlbr. 1931
Buellia pachysporoides Vain. 1931
Buellia parasema var. disciformis Th.Fr. (sic) probably (Fr.) Arnold 1858, accepted as Buellia disciformis (Fr.) Mudd, (1861)
Buellia parasema var. sanguinea Müll. Arg. 1888
Buellia parasema var. vulgata  Th. Fr. 1874 accepted as Buellia disciformis (Fr.) Mudd, (1861)
Buellia perigrapta (Stizenb.) Zahlbr. 1931
Buellia permodica (Stizenb.) Zahlbr. 1931
Buellia perspersa J. Steiner 1926
Buellia praelata (Stizenb.) Zahlbr. 1931
Buellia procellarum A. Massal. 1861
Buellia procellarum var. continuior J. Steiner 1926
Buellia procellarum var. repens J. Steiner 1926
Buellia proserpens var. continuior J. Steiner 1926.
Buellia proserpens var. repens J. Steiner 1926
Buellia protothallina (Kremp.) Vain. 1903
Buellia protothallina var. indissimilis  Vain. 1903
Buellia punctata (Hoffm.) A. Massal. 1852
Buellia punctata f. marcidula (Nyl.) Zahlbr. 1931
Buellia punctata f. punctiformis (DC.) Hazsl. 1884
Buellia punctata var. aequata (Ach.) Zahlbr. 1931
Buellia punetiformis (DC.) A. Massal. 1852
Buellia pura Vain. 1926
Buellia quaterna Zahlbr. 1936
Buellia rhodesiaca Zahlbr. 1932
Buellia rinodinea A. Massal. 1861
Buellia rudis (Stizenb.) Zahlbr. 1931
Buellia rusticorum (Stizenb.) Zahlbr. 1931
Buellia schinziana Müll. Arg. 1888
Buellia sequax (Nyl.) Zahlbr., (1931) recorded as Buellia abstracta (Nyl.) H. Olivier 1903 
Buellia spuria (Schaer.) Anzi 1860,
Buellia spuria var. ferruginea (Schaer.) Anzi 1860,
Buellia spuria var. insularis (A. Massal.) Jatta 1900
Buellia stellulata (Taylor) Mudd 1861, 
Buellia stellulata f. albosparsa (Stizenb.) Zahlbr. 1931
Buellia stellulata f. hybrida (Stizenb.) Zahlbr. 1931
Buellia stellulata f. murina (Stizenb.) Zahlbr. 1931
Buellia stizenbergeri Zahlbr. 1931
Buellia subalbula (Nyl.) Müll. Arg. 1880
Buellia subcinerascens (Nyl.) Zahlbr. 1931 accepted as Lecidea subcinerascens Nyl., (1877)
Buellia subdisciformis Vain.(sic) probably (Leight.) Jatta 1900,
Buellia subtristis (Nyl.) Zahlbr. 1931
Buellia tetrapla (Nyl.) Müll. Arg., (1888) recorded as Buellia callispora var. tetrapla (Nyl.) J. Steiner 1907
Buellia transvaalica (Stizenb.) Zahlbr. 1931
Buellia triplicans Zahlbr. 1932
Buellia vernicoma (Tuck.) Tuck. 1866
Buellia verruculosa (Sm.) Mudd 1861, accepted as Buellia ocellata (Flörke ex Flot.) Körb., (1855)
Buellia viridiatra (Wulfen) H. Olivier 1901 accepted as Rhizocarpon viridiatrum (Wulfen) Körb., (1855)

Genus: Bulgariastrum Syd. & P. Syd. 1913 accepted as Dermea Fr., (1825)
Bulgariastrum africanum Syd. & P. Syd. 1915
Bulgariastrum bullatum Doidge 1948

Genus: Bulliardella (Sacc.) Paoli 1905 accepted as Actidium Fr., (1815)
Bulliardella capensis Doidge 1948,

By
Genus: Byliana Dippen. 1930, accepted as Palawaniella Doidge, (1921)
Byliana halleriae Dippen. 1930 accepted as Palawaniella halleriae (Dippen.) Arx, (1962)

Genus: Byssochlamys Westling 1909
Byssochlamys lagunculariae (C. Ram) Samson, Houbraken & Frisvad, (2009) recorded as Byssochlamys niveaWestling 1909
Byssochlamys niveaWestling 1909 accepted as Byssochlamys lagunculariae (C. Ram) Samson, Houbraken & Frisvad, (2009)

Genus: Byssoloma Trevis. 1853
Byssoloma tricholomum f. confluens  Vain. ex Van der Byl 1931

Genus: Byssospora *
Byssospora stupposa Massal.*

References

Sources

See also
 List of bacteria of South Africa
 List of Oomycetes of South Africa
 List of slime moulds of South Africa

 List of fungi of South Africa
 List of fungi of South Africa – A
 List of fungi of South Africa – C
 List of fungi of South Africa – D
 List of fungi of South Africa – E
 List of fungi of South Africa – F
 List of fungi of South Africa – G
 List of fungi of South Africa – H
 List of fungi of South Africa – I
 List of fungi of South Africa – J
 List of fungi of South Africa – K
 List of fungi of South Africa – L
 List of fungi of South Africa – M
 List of fungi of South Africa – N
 List of fungi of South Africa – O
 List of fungi of South Africa – P
 List of fungi of South Africa – Q
 List of fungi of South Africa – R
 List of fungi of South Africa – S
 List of fungi of South Africa – T
 List of fungi of South Africa – U
 List of fungi of South Africa – V
 List of fungi of South Africa – W
 List of fungi of South Africa – X
 List of fungi of South Africa – Y
 List of fungi of South Africa – Z

Further reading
 

Fungi
Fungi B
South Africa